Bairavi is a 1978 Indian Tamil-language film directed by M. Bhaskar, and produced by Kalaignanam, who also wrote the story and dialogues. It stars Rajinikanth, Sripriya and Geetha. Geetha was introduced in this film. Srikanth played the role of the main villain. Sudheer, Manorama and Suruli Rajan played other major roles. The film was released on 8 June 1978.

Plot 
Mookaiyah and his sister Bairavi are the children of a drunkard. They are separated after Bhairavi gets lost in an accident. Following this, Mookaiyah becomes a servant of a local landlord Rajalingam. Mookaiyah is a loyal servant and does whatever is asked of him. The landlord, Rajalingam, forces Mookaiyah to abduct a young girl from a neighbouring village, Bhagyam. Rajalingam rapes her in the absence of Mookaiyah. Maanikam, Bhagyam's adopted brother, finds to know about the incident. When the police investigate Maanikam, Mookaiyah discovers that Bhagyam is his long-lost sister (Bairavi). Then he immediately approaches Rajalingam and forces him to marry Bairavi; he was not ready to accept it at first but after a while he promises to Mookaiyah that he will marry Bairavi. As Mookaiyah was the person who abducted Bairavi, the police suspect that he is the culprit, comes to Rajalingam's house to know about Mookaiyah. Rajalingam also alleges to Police that Mookaiyah only raped Bairavi. The police therefore arrest Mookaiyah, based on the statement of Rajalingam. Meanwhile, Rajalingam plans to kill Bairavi when she was in an unconscious state in hospital. If Bairavi become conscious and gives a statement to the police then he will definitely be prone to punishment, so he kills her. After knowing about his adopted sister's murder, Maanikam vows to take revenge on Mookaiyah, whom he believes to be responsible for Bairavi's death. Meanwhile, Mookaiyah escapes from jail knowing about the incident. He then sets out to kill the landlord in revenge for his sister's death.

Cast 
Srikanth as Rajalingam
Rajinikanth as Mookaiyah
V. K. Ramasamy as Meenatchi's father
Suruli Rajan as Pannai
Sudheer as Manicam
Sripriya as Pavunu
Manorama as Meenatchi
Y. Vijaya as Leela
 VR Thilagam
Geetha as Bairavi
T. K. Ramachandran as the father of Mookaiyah and Bairavi
K. Natraj as Sandiyar

Production 

Kalaignanam, who was impressed with Rajinikanth's acting style, went straight ahead casting him in the lead role for Bhairavi, and paid him an advance. Initially, Sandow M. M. A. Chinnappa Thevar agreed to give financial support for Bhairavi but when he heard Rajinikanth is the lead actor, he withdrew the support and advised Kalaignanam to stop the film or change the actor and questioned him for choosing a villain in the lead role and hero as villain (Srikanth was acting as hero those days) and he assured that it will be a huge loss. Kalaignanam approached Muthuraman to play negative role but he refused to portray a negative character, Srikanth was finally selected for the role. M. Bhaskar made his directorial debut with this film.

Music 
The soundtrack and background score was composed by Ilaiyaraaja. All the lyrics were written by Kannadasan except Kattapulle written by Chidambaranathan.

Release 
Bairavi was released on 8 June 1978. A 35-foot high cutout of Rajinikanth was built at Plaza Theatre by S. Thanu to promote the film. In the posters, Rajinikanth was referred to as "Superstar", although he was initially against it.

References

Bibliography

External links 
 

1970s Tamil-language films
1978 directorial debut films
1978 films
Films directed by M. Bhaskar
Films scored by Ilaiyaraaja
Indian black-and-white films